Lake Oscar may refer to the following bodies of water:

Lake Oscar (Douglas County, Minnesota)
Lake Oscar (Otter Tail County, Minnesota)

See also
Lac-Oscar, Quebec, an unorganized territory